Betty Broadbent (November 1, 1909 – March 28, 1983), also known as the “Tattooed Venus”, is regarded as the most photographed tattooed lady of the 20th century. She also worked as a tattoo artist. In 1981, she was the first person to be inducted into the Tattoo Hall of Fame.

Early life 
Broadbent was born Sue Lillian Brown in Zellwood, Florida. Her parents were from North Carolina and moved to Philadelphia when she was a child.

Career  

Broadbent’s interest in tattooing began at the age of fourteen, when, while working as a nanny in Atlantic City, she met Jack Redcloud on the boardwalk. Redcloud was covered in tattoos, which fascinated Broadbent. This fascination would lead Redcloud to introduce Broadbent to his tattoo artist, Charlie Wagner. In 1927, Wagner, alongside several other tattoo artists, including Tony Rhineagear, Joe Van Hart, and Red Gibbons, tattooed a bodysuit of over 565 tattoos on Broadbent. 

Charlie Wagner was friends with the circus man Clyde Ingalls. When Ingalls discovered Broadbent’s passion for tattooing, he offered her a position at the circus. In the same year, Broadbent began exhibiting her art with the Ringling Brothers and Barnum and Bailey Circus. While working at the circus, Broadbent also trained as a steer rider who would perform with circus performer Tom Mix. Later in Broadbent’s career, she learned how to ride horses and mules. 

In addition to exhibiting her art, Broadbent worked as a tattoo artist.  She worked in shops across the country, including in Montreal, San Francisco, and New York. 

In 1937, she began to work internationally. She spent time working for independent circuses in both New Zealand and Australia. After her return home to the United States and until her retirement in 1967, she continued to perform and travel with a sideshow. While working in a sideshow in 1939, Broadbent challenged the traditional views of beauty for women during the 1930s by participating in a beauty pageant at the 1939 New York World's Fair. 

Broadbent died in her sleep while living in Florida on March 28, 1983.

Artwork 
Broadbent’s tattoos varied in theme. On Broadbent’s back, she had a tattoo of the Madonna and child. The art on her lower limbs included a tattoo of Charles Lindbergh on her right leg and a tattoo of Pancho Villa on her left. One of Broadbent’s more famous tattoos took over six sittings, a spread-eagle that stretched from one shoulder to the other. On May 3 of 1939, the New York Times quoted Broadbent stating, “It hurt something awful, but it was worth it.”

See also
Janet 'Rusty' Skuse
Tattooed Man
History of tattooing
Lydia the Tattooed Lady

References

Further reading
 Caplan, J. (2000). Written on the body: The tattoo in European and American history / edited by Jane Caplan. London: Reaktion. 
 Albert Parry, Tattoo: secrets of a strange art as practised among the natives of the United States (Simon and Schuster, 1933).
 Michael McCabe, ed., New York City tattoo: the oral history of an urban art (Hardy Marks, 1997)
 Francine Hornberger, Carny folk: the world's weirdest sideshow acts (Citadel Press, 2005).
 Meger, Sarah A. "The Baltimore Tattoo Museum." Corcoran College of Art + Design, 2010. United States—District of Columbia: ProQuest Dissertations & Theses A&I.
 "Body Art: Marks of Identity." African Arts 34.1 (2001): 83–5.
 Tattooed Lady History
 Jane Caplan, ed., Written on the Body: The Tattoo in European and American History (2000).
 Tallent, Robert W. "Tattooing." Leatherneck (1952): 22–5.

1983 deaths
1909 births
People known for being heavily tattooed
American circus performers
Tattoo artists
Sideshow performers